Hahntennjoch (el. 1894 m.) is a high mountain pass in the Austrian Alps in the Bundesland of Tyrol.

It connects the upper valley of the Inn with the Lech valley. The road leads from Imst to Elmen, a distance of 29 km. It is popular with motorcyclists and cyclists.

It is a much shorter route than the Fern Pass or the Flexen Pass over the Arlberg. The road is winding and steep, with grades up to 18.9 percent and is closed to traffic over 14 metric tons. The road is generally closed from November to April.

The pass is prone to avalanches, falling rocks, and mudslides. In  2004, an automatic system was installed that closes the road in case of blockage.

History
The present road was built in the late 1960s and opened in 1969.

See also
 List of highest paved roads in Europe
 List of mountain passes

External links

 Profile on climbbybike.com

Mountain passes of Tyrol (state)
Mountain passes of the Alps
Lechtal Alps